Muscat is the capital and most populated city in Oman. It is the seat of the Governorate of Muscat. According to the National Centre for Statistics and Information (NCSI), the total population of Muscat Governorate was 1.4 million as of September 2018. Known since the early 1st century AD as an important trading port between the west and the east, Muscat was ruled by various indigenous tribes as well as foreign powers such as the Persians, the Portuguese Empire and the Ottoman Empire at various points in its history. A regional military power in the 18th century, Muscat's influence extended as far as East Africa and Zanzibar. As an important port-town in the Gulf of Oman, Muscat attracted foreign tradesmen and settlers such as the Persians, Balochs and Sindhis. Since the ascension of Qaboos bin Said as Sultan of Oman in 1970, Muscat has experienced rapid infrastructural development that has led to the growth of a vibrant economy and a multi-ethnic society. Muscat is termed as a Beta - Global City by the Globalization and World Cities Research Network.

The rocky Western Al Hajar Mountains dominate the landscape of Muscat. The city lies on the Arabian Sea along the Gulf of Oman and is in the proximity of the strategic Straits of Hormuz. Low-lying white buildings typify most of Muscat's urban landscape, while the port-district of Muttrah, with its corniche and harbour, form the north-eastern periphery of the city. Muscat's economy is dominated by trade, petroleum, liquified natural gas and porting.

Toponymy
Ptolemy's Map of Arabia identifies the territories of Cryptus Portus and Moscha Portus. Scholars are divided in opinion on which of the two is related to the city of Muscat. Similarly, Arrianus references Omana and Moscha in Voyage of Nearchus. Interpretations of Arrianus' work by William Vincent and Jean Baptiste Bourguignon d'Anville conclude that Omana was a reference to Oman, while Moscha referred to Muscat. Similarly, other scholars identify Pliny the Elder's reference to Amithoscuta to be Muscat.

The origin of the word Muscat is disputed. Some authors claim that the word has Arabic origins – from moscha, meaning an inflated hide or skin. Other authors claim that the name Muscat means anchorage or the place of "letting fall the anchor". Other derivations include muscat from Old Persian, meaning strong-scented, or from Arabic, meaning falling-place, or hidden. Cryptus Portus is synonymous with Oman ("hidden land"). But "Ov-man" (Omman), and the old Sumerian name Magan (Maa-kan), means sea-people in Arabic. An inhabitant is a Muscatter, Muscatian, Muscatite or Muscatan. In 1793 AD the capital was transferred from Rustaq to Muscat.

History

Evidence of communal activity in the area around Muscat dates back to the 6th millennium BCE in Ras al-Hamra, where burial sites of fishermen have been found. The graves appear to be well formed and indicate the existence of burial rituals. South of Muscat, remnants of Harappan pottery indicate some level of contact with the Indus Valley civilisation. Muscat's notability as a port was acknowledged as early as the 1st century CE by the Greek geographer Ptolemy, who referred to it as Cryptus Portus (the Hidden Port), and by Pliny the Elder, who called it Amithoscuta.

The port fell to a Sassanid invasion in the 3rd century CE, under the rule of Shapur I, while conversion to Islam occurred during the 7th century. Muscat's importance as a trading port continued to grow in the centuries that followed, under the influence of the Azd dynasty, a local tribe. The establishment of the First Imamate in the 9th century was the first step in consolidating disparate Omani tribal factions under the banner of an Ibadi state. However, tribal skirmishes continued, allowing the Abbasids of Baghdad to conquer Oman. The Abbasids occupied the region until the 11th century, when they were driven out by the local Yahmad tribe. Power over Oman shifted from the Yahmad tribe to the Azdi Nabahinah clan, during whose rule, the people of coastal ports such as Muscat prospered from maritime trade and close alliances with the Indian subcontinent, at the cost of the alienation of the people of the interior of Oman.

The Portuguese admiral Afonso de Albuquerque sailed to Muscat in 1507, in an attempt to establish trade relations. As he approached the harbour, his ships were fired on. He then decided to conquer Muscat. Most of the city burned to the ground during and after the fighting.

The Portuguese maintained a hold on Muscat for over a century, despite challenges from Persia and a bombardment of the town by the Ottoman Turks in 1546. The Turks twice captured Muscat from the Portuguese, in the Capture of Muscat (1552) and 1581–88. The election of Nasir bin Murshid Al-Ya'rubi as Imam of Oman in 1624 changed the balance of power again in the region, from the Persians and the Portuguese to local Omanis. Among the most important castles and forts in Muscat, the Al Jalali Fort and the Al-Mirani Fort are the most prominent buildings left by the Portuguese. On August 16, 1648 the Imam dispatched an army to Muscat, which captured and demolished the high towers of the Portuguese, weakening their grip over the town. Decisively, in 1650, a small but determined body of the Imam's troops attacked the port at night, forcing an eventual Portuguese surrender on January 23, 1650. A civil war and repeated incursions by the Persian king Nader Shah in the 18th century destabilised the region, and further strained relations between the interior and Muscat. This power vacuum in Oman led to the emergence of the Al Bu Sa‘id dynasty, which has ruled Oman ever since.

Muscat's naval and military supremacy was re-established in the 19th century by Said bin Sultan, who signed a treaty with U.S. President Andrew Jackson's representative Edmund Roberts on September 21, 1833. Having gained control over Zanzibar, in 1840 Said moved his capital to Stone Town, the ancient quarter of Zanzibar City; however, after his death in 1856, control over Zanzibar was lost when it became an independent sultanate under his sixth son, Majid bin Said (1834/5–1870), while the third son, Thuwaini bin Said, became the Sultan of Oman.

During the second half of the 19th century, the fortunes of the Al Bu Sa`id declined and friction with the Imams of the interior resurfaced. Muscat and Muttrah were attacked by tribes from the interior in 1895 and again in 1915. A tentative ceasefire was brokered by the British, which gave the interior more autonomy. However, conflicts among the disparate tribes of the interior, and with the Sultan of Muscat and Oman continued into the 1950s, and eventually escalated into the Dhofar Rebellion (1962). The rebellion forced the Sultan Said bin Taimur to seek the assistance of the British in quelling the uprisings from the interior. The failed assassination attempt of April 26, 1966 on Said bin Taimur led to the further isolation of the Sultan, who had moved his residence from Muscat to Salalah, amidst the civilian armed conflict. On July 23, 1970, Qaboos bin Said, son of the Sultan, staged a bloodless coup d'état in the Salalah palace with the assistance of the British, and took over as ruler.

With the assistance of the British, Qaboos bin Said put an end to the Dhofar uprising and consolidated disparate tribal territories. He renamed the country the Sultanate of Oman (called Muscat and Oman hitherto), in an attempt to end to the interior's isolation from Muscat. Qaboos enlisted the services of capable Omanis to fill positions in his new government, drawing from such corporations as Petroleum Development Oman. New ministries for social services such as health and education were established. The construction of Mina Qaboos, a new port conceived initially by Sa`id bin Taimur, was developed during the early days of Qaboos' rule. Similarly, a new international airport was developed in Muscat's Seeb district. A complex of offices, warehouses, shops and homes transformed the old village of Ruwi in Muttrah into a commercial district. The first five-year development plan in 1976 emphasised infrastructural development of Muscat, which provided new opportunities for trade and tourism in the 1980s–1990s, attracting migrants from around the region. On June 6, 2007, Cyclone Gonu hit Muscat causing extensive damage to property, infrastructure and commercial activity.

Early photographs of the city and harbour, taken in the early 20th century by German explorer and photographer, Hermann Burchardt, are now held at the Ethnological Museum of Berlin.

Geography and geology

Muscat is located in northeast Oman. The Tropic of Cancer passes south of the area. It is bordered to its west by the plains of the Al Batinah Region and to its east by Ash Sharqiyah Region. The interior plains of Ad Dakhiliyah Region border Muscat to the south, while the Gulf of Oman forms the northern and western periphery of the city. The water along the coast of Muscat runs deep, forming two natural harbours, in Muttrah and Muscat. The Central Hajar Mountains run through the northern coastline of the city.

Volcanic rocks, predominantly serpentinite and diorite are apparent in the Muscat area and extend along the Gulf of Oman coast for ten or twelve  from the district of Darsait to Yiti. These igneous rocks consists of serpentinite, greenstone, and basalt, typical of rocks in southeastern regions of the Arabian Peninsula. The hills in Muscat are mostly devoid of vegetation but are rich in iron.

The halophytic sabkha type desert vegetation is predominant in Muscat. The Qurum Nature Reserve contains plants such as the Arthrocnemum Macrostachyum and Halopeplis Perfoliata. Coral reefs are common in Muscat. Acropora reefs exist in the sheltered bays of the satellite towns of Jussah and Khairan. Additionally, smaller Porites reef colonies exist in Khairan, which have fused to form a flat-top pavement that is visible at low tide. Crabs and spiny crayfish are found in the waters of the Muscat area, as are sardines and bonito. Glassfish are common in freshwater estuaries, such as the Qurum Nature Reserve.

The Sultan Qaboos Street forms the main artery of Muscat, running west-to-east through the city. The street eventually becomes Al Nahdah Street near Al Wattayah. Several inter-city roads such as Nizwa Road and Al Amrat Road, intersect with Al Sultan Qaboos Road (in Rusail and Ruwi, respectively). Muttrah, with the Muscat Harbour, Corniche, and Mina Qaboos, is located in the north-eastern coastline of the city, adjacent to the Gulf of Oman. Other coastal districts of Muscat include Darsait, Mina Al Fahal, Ras Al Hamar, Al Qurum Heights, Al Khuwair, and Al Seeb. Residential and commercial districts further inland include Al Hamriyah, Al Wadi Al Kabir, Ruwi, Al Wattayah, Madinat Qaboos, Al Azaiba and Al Ghubra.

Climate

Muscat features a hot, arid climate (Köppen climate classification BWh) with long, sweltering summers and warm "winters". In general, precipitation is scarce in Muscat, with several months on average seeing only a trace of rainfall. However, in recent years, heavy precipitation events from tropical systems originating in the Arabian Sea have affected the city. Cyclone Gonu in June 2007 and Cyclone Phet in June 2010 affected the city with damaging winds and rainfall amounts exceeding  in just a single day.

Economy

Muscat's economy, like that of Oman, is dominated by trade. The more traditional exports of the city included dates, mother of pearl, and fish. Many of the souks of Muttrah sell these items and traditional Omani artefacts. Petroleum Development Oman has been central to Muscat's economy since at least 1962 and is the country's second largest employer, after the government. Muscat also has major trading companies such as the Suhail Bahwan Group, which is a trading partner for corporations such as Toshiba, Subaru, Seiko, Hewlett Packard, General Motors, RAK Ceramics; Saud Bahwan Group whose trading partners are Toyota, Daihatsu, KIA and Hertz Rent-a-Car; Zubair Automotive whose trading partners include Mitsubishi, and Chrysler brands such as Dodge; and Moosa AbdulRahman Hassan which operates as one of the oldest automotive agencies in the entire region having been established in 1927. The private Health Care sector of Muscat, Oman has numerous hospitals and clinics.

The Muscat Securities Market is the principal stock exchange of Oman. It is located in Central Business District of Muscat and it was established in 1988, and has since distinguished itself as a pioneer among its regional peers in terms of transparency and disclosure regulations and requirements.

Mina'a Sultan Qaboos, Muscat's main trading port, is a trading hub between the Persian Gulf, the Indian subcontinent and the Far East with an annual volume of about 1.6 million tons. However, the emergence of the Jebel Ali Free Zone in neighboring Dubai, United Arab Emirates, has made that port the premier maritime trading port of the region with about 44 million tons traded in cargo annually. Many infrastructural facilities are owned and operated by the government of Oman. Omantel is the major telecommunications organization in Oman and provides local, long-distance and international dialing facilities and operates as the country's only ISP. Recent liberalization of the mobile telephone market has seen the establishment of a second provider, Ooredoo.

Muscat is home to multibillion-dollar conglomerate CK Industries with their headquarters located in Ruwi. Ajman based Amtek Industries also have a couple of offices around the city. It is also home to Galfar Engineering, headed by P. Mohammed Ali.

The airline Oman Air has its head office on the grounds of Muscat International Airport.

Demographics
According to the 2003 census conducted by the Oman Ministry of National Economy, the population of Muscat is over 630,000, which included 370,000 males and 260,000 females. Muscat formed the second largest governorate in the country, after Al Batinah, accounting for 27% of the total population of Oman. As of 2003, Omanis constituted 60% of the total population of Muscat, while expatriates accounted for about 40%. The population density of the city was 162.1 per km.

The governorate of Muscat comprises six : Muttrah, Bawshar, Seeb, Al Amrat, Muscat and Qurayyat. Seeb, located in the western section of the governorate, was the most populous (with over 220,000 residents), while Muttrah had the highest number of expatriates (with over 100,000). Approximately 71% of the population was within the 15–64 age group, with the average Omani age being 23 years. About 10% of the population is illiterate, an improvement when compared to the 18% illiteracy rate recorded during the 1993 census. Expatriates accounted for over 60% of the labour force, dominated by males, who accounted for 80% of the city's total labour. A majority of expatriates (34%) engineering-related occupations, while most Omanis worked in engineering, clerical, scientific or technical fields. The defense sector was the largest employer for Omanis, while construction, wholesale and retail trade employed the largest number of expatriates.

The ethnic makeup of Muscat has historically been influenced by people not native to the Arabian Peninsula. British Parliamentary papers dating back to the 19th century indicate the presence of a significant Hindu Gujarati merchants in the city. Indeed, four Hindu temples existed in Muscat ca. 1760. Christianity flourished in Oman (Bēṯ Mazūnāyē "land of the Maganites"; a name deriving from its Sumerian designation) from the late 4th century to early 5th century. Missionary activity by the Assyrians of the Church of the East resulted in a significant Christian population living in the region, with a bishop being attested by 424 AD under the Metropolitan of Fars and Arabia. The rise of Islam saw the Syriac and Arabic-speaking Christian population eventually disappear. It is thought to have been brought back in by the Portuguese in 1507. Protestant missionaries established a hospital in Muscat in the 19th century.

Like the rest of Oman, Arabic is the predominant language of the city. In addition, English, Balochi, Sindhi, Swahili and Indian languages such as Bengali, Gujarati, Hindi, Konkani, Malayalam, Marathi, Odia, Tamil, Telugu and Urdu are spoken by the residents of Muscat.

Islam is the predominant religion in the city, with most followers being Ibadi Muslims. Non-Muslims are allowed to practice their religion, but may not proselytize publicly or distribute religious literature. In 2017 the Sultanate of Oman unveiled the Mushaf Muscat, an interactive calligraphic Quran following a brief from the Omani Ministry of Endowments and Religious Affairs.

Notable landmarks

The city has numerous mosques including the Sultan Qaboos Grand Mosque, Ruwi Mosque, Saeed bin Taimoor and Zawawi Mosque. A few Shi'ite mosques also exist here. Muscat has a number of museums. These include Museum of Omani Heritage, National Museum of Oman, Oman Children's Museum, Bait Al Zubair, Oman Oil and Gas Exhibition Centre, Omani French Museum, Sultan's Armed Forces Museum and the Omani Aquarium and Marine Science and Fisheries Centre. The Bait Al Falaj Fort played an important role in Muscat's military history.

Recent projects include an opera house which opened on October 14, 2011. One of the most notable new projects is the Oman National Museum. It is expected to be an architectural jewel along with the Sultan Qaboos Grand Mosque. Visitors are also encouraged to visit Old Muscat and the Old Palace. The main shopping district is situated in Al Qurum Commercial Area. However, shopping malls are spread out throughout the city. One of the largest malls in Oman is Oman Avenues Mall, located in Ghubra. The second largest mall is in Seeb, near the international airport, called City Centre Muscat, housing all major international brands and the largest Carrefour hypermarket. Two new megamalls opened recently in the Mabela area of Muscat are Al Araimi Boulevard and Mall of Muscat. Mall of Muscat is also home to Oman Aquarium and a snow park which will be opened in late 2019.

Transport

Waterways

Sultan Qaboos Port serves as one of the most important ports of Muscat Governorate, which is well known for being sailing of many commercial ships and boats. Here also, the traditional boats of Arabian Peninsula named Dhows can be also seen. This port since many centuries have been a main commercial and financial centre in terms of its international maritime trade.

Airport

Muscat is the headquarters for the local Oman Air, which flies to several destinations within the Middle East, the Indian Subcontinent, East Africa and Europe.

Road Transportation

The Muscat area is well serviced by paved roads and dual-carriageway connects most major cities and towns in the country. 

Since November 2015, Public transportation in Muscat has been revamped with a bus network connecting most important parts of the city with a fleet of modern Mwasalat (earlier Oman National Transport Company buses. 
Mwasalat buses procured from VDL of the Netherlands and MAN of Germany have several hi-tech features, including free Wi-Fi. 
 Route 1 (Ruwi-Mabela) serves people travelling major shopping destinations (Oman Avenues Mall, Muscat Grand Mall, Qurum City Centre, Muscat City Centre, Markaz al Bhaja) and Muscat Airport. 
 Route 2 (Ruwi-Wadi Kabir) serves the residential and industrial district of Wadi Kabir. 
 Route 3 (Ruwi-Wadi Adei) serves the downmarket residential belt of Wadi Adei. 
 Route 4 (Ruwi-Mattrah) serves the tourist destination of Muttrah Corniche, Al Alam Palace, Muttrah Fort, National Museum and Port Sultan Qaboos and churches/temples.
 Route 5 (Ruwi-Amerat) serves the rapidly developing Amerat suburb. 
 Route 6 (Ruwi-SQU&KOM) serves the student community of Sultan Qaboos University (SQU) and the office commuters of Knowledge Oasis Muscat (KOM).
 Route 7 serves the three major malls in Muscat - Al Araimi Boulevard, Mall of Muscat and Markaz al Bhaja and Muscat City Centre. 
 Route 8 serves Al Khuwair and Al Mouj Integrated Complex
 Route 9 serves Ansab and Misfah industrial area.
 Route 10 serves Seeb Souq and Mawelah Vegetable Market.
 Route 12 serves Oman Convention and Exhibition, Ghala areas.
 Route 14 serves Petroleum Development Oman, Qurm Natural Park, Qurm City Centre, Khoula Hospital.
 Routes 1b and 1A are special buses to Muscat International Airport.

Several forms of public transport are popular in Oman. Most popular are the "Baiza" buses, so named for the lower denomination of the Omani rial, the baiza (an adaptation of the Indian lower denomination paisa). These are relatively inexpensive and service all major roadways, as well as a wide and loose network of smaller byways in the greater Muscat metropolitan area, opportunistically dropping off and picking up passengers at any location. Less popular and slightly more expensive are large public buses, coloured red and green, whose service is limited to major roadways and point-to-point travel routes between Oman's major cities and towns. Taxis, also colour-coded orange and white, provide semi-personal transportation in the form of both individual hire and the same opportunistic roadway service as Baiza buses.

Baiza buses and colour-coded orange-and-white taxis are unmetered, after several government initiatives to introduce meters were rejected. The fare is set by way of negotiation, although taxi drivers usually adhere to certain unwritten rules for fares within the city. In many countries, one is advised to negotiate a fare with the driver before getting into a taxi. However, in Oman, asking for the fare beforehand often demonstrates a passenger's newness and unfamiliarity with the area. One should always find out the normally accepted fare for one's journey from one's hotel or host before looking for a taxi. Taxis will also generally take passengers to locations out of the city, including Sohar, Buraimi and Dubai.

Culture

Outwardly, Oman shares many of the cultural characteristics of its Arab neighbours, particularly those in the Gulf Cooperation Council. Despite these similarities, important factors make Oman unique in the Middle East. These result as much from geography and history as from culture and economics. The relatively recent and artificial nature of the state of Oman makes it difficult to describe a national culture; however, sufficient cultural heterogeneity exists within its national boundaries to make Oman distinct from other Arab States of the Persian Gulf. Oman's cultural diversity is greater than that of its Arab neighbours, given its historical expansion to the Swahili Coast and the Indian Ocean.

Oman has a long tradition of shipbuilding, as maritime travel played a major role in the Omanis' ability to stay in contact with the civilisations of the ancient world. Sur was one of the most famous shipbuilding cities of the Indian Ocean. The Al Ghanja ship takes one whole year to build. Other types of Omani ship include As Sunbouq and Al Badan.

In March 2016, archaeologists working off Al-Hallaniyah Island identified a shipwreck believed to be that of the Esmeralda from Vasco da Gama's 1502–1503 fleet. The wreck was initially discovered in 1998. Later underwater excavations took place between 2013 and 2015 through a partnership between the Oman Ministry of Heritage and Culture and Blue Water Recoveries Ltd., a shipwreck recovery company. The vessel was identified through such artifacts as a "Portuguese coin minted for trade with India (one of only two coins of this type known to exist) and stone cannonballs engraved with what appear to be the initials of Vincente Sodré, da Gama's maternal uncle and the commander of the Esmeralda."

Notable people
Mohammed Al Barwani (b. 1952), billionaire and founder of MB Holding
Avicii (1989–2018), Swedish music producer and DJ, died in Muscat Hills
Mahesh Bhupathi (b. 1974), Indian tennis player, studied at the Indian School, Muscat
Sarah-Jane Dias (b. 1974), Indian actress, studied at the Indian School, Muscat
Isla Fisher (b. 1976), Australian actress, born to Scottish parents and lived in Australia
Ali Al-Habsi (b. 1981), professional footballer, captain of the Oman national and goalkeeper for Saudi club Al Hilal
Amad Al-Hosni (b. 1984), professional footballer
Ahmad Al Harthy (b. 1981), racecar driver
Fatma Al-Nabhani (b. 1991), tennis player
Ali bin Masoud al Sunaidy (b. 1964), former Omani Minister of Commerce and Industry
Sneha Ullal (b. 1987), Indian Bollywood Actress, studied at the Indian School, Muscat
Nitya Vidyasagar (b. 1985), American actress
Al Faisal Al Zubair (b.1998), racecar driver

See also

 Old Muscat

Bibliography

 Forster, Charles, The Historical Geography of Arabia: Or, The Patriarchal Evidences of Revealed Religion : a Memoir, Duncan and Malcolm, 1844

References

Further reading

omancensus.net (PDF)
2010 Preliminary Results (PDF)

External links

Ministry of Foreign Affairs
Official Ministry Of Tourism site
omancensus.net (PDF)

 
Populated places in the Muscat Governorate
Capitals in Asia
Populated coastal places in Oman
Populated places established in the 2nd century
Former Portuguese colonies
Port cities in the Arabian Peninsula
Gulf of Oman
2nd-century establishments